The remilitarization of the Rhineland began on 7 March 1936, when German military forces entered the Rhineland, which directly contravened the Treaty of Versailles and the Locarno Treaties. Neither France nor Britain was prepared for a military response, so they did not act. After 1939 commentators often said that a strong military move in 1936 might have ruined Hitler's expansionist plans.  However, recent historiography agrees that both public and elite opinion in Britain and France strongly opposed a military intervention, and neither had an army prepared to move in.

After the end of World War I, the Rhineland came under Allied occupation. Under the 1919 Treaty of Versailles, the German military was forbidden from all territories west of the Rhine or within 50 km east of it. The 1925 Locarno Treaties reaffirmed the then-permanently-demilitarized status of the Rhineland. In 1929, German Foreign Minister Gustav Stresemann negotiated the withdrawal of the Allied forces. The last soldiers left the Rhineland in June 1930.

After the Nazi regime took power in January 1933, Germany began working towards rearmament and the remilitarization of the Rhineland. On 7 March 1936, using the Franco-Soviet Treaty of Mutual Assistance as a pretext, Chancellor and Führer Adolf Hitler ordered the Wehrmacht to march 20,000 German troops into the Rhineland, which caused joyous celebrations across Germany. The French and the British governments, unwilling to risk war, decided against enforcing the treaties.

The remilitarization and the German rearmament changed the balance of power in Europe from France and its allies towards Germany by allowing Germany to pursue a policy of aggression in Western Europe that had been blocked by the demilitarized status of the Rhineland. 

The fact that Britain and France did not intervene made Hitler believe that neither country would get in the way of Nazi foreign policy. That made him decide to quicken the pace of German preparations for war and the domination of Europe. On 14 March 1936, during a speech in Munich, Hitler stated, “Neither threats nor warnings will prevent me from going my way. I follow the path assigned to me by Providence with the instinctive sureness of a sleepwalker".

Background

Versailles and Locarno

Under Articles 42, 43 and 44 of the 1919 Treaty of Versailles, which was imposed on Germany by the Allies after World War I, Germany was "forbidden to maintain or construct any fortification either on the Left bank of the Rhine or on the Right bank to the west of a line drawn fifty kilometers to the East of the Rhine". If a violation "in any manner whatsoever" of the article took place, it "shall be regarded as committing a hostile act... and as calculated to disturb the peace of the world".
The Locarno Treaties, signed in October 1925 by Germany, France, Italy and Britain, stated that the Rhineland should continue its demilitarized status permanently. Locarno was regarded as important by being a voluntary German acceptance of the Rhineland's demilitarized status, as opposed to the Diktat of Versailles. Locarno's terms had Britain and Italy vaguely guarantee the Franco-German border and the continued demilitarized status of the Rhineland against a "flagrant violation". A German attack on France required Britain and Italy to go to France's aid under Locarno, and a French attack on Germany required Britain and Italy to come Germany's aid. The American historian Gerhard Weinberg called the demilitarized status of the Rhineland the "single most important guarantee of peace in Europe" by preventing Germany from attacking its western neighbours and, since the demilitarized zone rendered Germany defenseless in the West, by making it impossible to attack its eastern neighbors by leaving Germany open to a devastating French offensive if the Germans tried to invade any state guaranteed by the French alliance system in Eastern Europe, the cordon sanitaire.

The Versailles Treaty also stipulated that Allied military forces would withdraw from the Rhineland by 1935. However, German Foreign Minister Gustav Stresemann announced in 1929 that Germany would not ratify the 1928 Young Plan and would stop paying reparations unless the Allies agreed to leave the Rhineland in 1930. The British delegation at the Hague Conference on German war reparations proposed decreasing the amount of money paid by Germany in reparations, in exchange for the British and French forces evacuating the Rhineland. The last British soldiers left in late 1929, and the last French soldiers left in June 1930.

As long as the French continued to occupy the Rhineland, it functioned as a form of "collateral" under which the French could respond to any German attempt at overt rearmament by annexing the Rhineland. Once the last French soldiers left the Rhineland in June 1930, it could no longer play its "collateral" role, which opened the door for German rearmament. The French decision to build the Maginot Line in 1929 was a tacit French admission that it would be only a matter of time before German rearmament on a massive scale would begin sometime in the 1930s and that the Rhineland was going to be remilitarized sooner or later. Intelligence from the Deuxième Bureau indicated that Germany had been violating Versailles throughout the 1920s with the considerable help of the Soviet Union. With the French troops out of the Rhineland, Germany could be expected to violate Versailles only more openly. The Maginot Line, in turn, lessened the importance of the Rhineland's demilitarized status from the view of French security.

Foreign policy
The foreign policy of Fascist Italy was to maintain an "equidistant" stance from all the major powers and to exercise the "determinant weight" with which the power Italy chose to align would decisively change the balance of power in Europe. The price of such an alignment would be support for Italian ambitions in Europe and/or Africa.

The foreign policy goal of the Soviet Union was set forth by Joseph Stalin in a speech on 19 January 1925 that if another world war broke out between the capitalist states, "We will enter the fray at the end, throwing our critical weight onto the scale, a weight that should prove to be decisive". To promote that goal, the global triumph of communism, the Soviet Union tended to support German efforts to challenge the Versailles system by assisting the secret rearmament of Germany, a policy that caused much tension with France.

An additional problem in Franco-Soviet relations was the Russian debt issue. Before 1917, the French had been by far the largest investors in Imperial Russia and the largest buyers of Russian debt. Thus, the decision by Vladimir Lenin in 1918 to repudiate all debts and to confiscate all private property owned by Russians or foreigners, had hurt French business and finance quite badly. The questions of both the Russian debt repudiation and of compensation for French businesses that had been affected by Soviet nationalisation policies poisoned Franco-Soviet relations until the early 1930s.

The cornerstone of interwar French diplomacy had been the cordon sanitaire in Eastern Europe, which was intended to keep both the Soviets and the Germans out of Eastern Europe. France had thus signed treaties of alliance with Poland in 1921, with Czechoslovakia in 1924, with Romania in 1926 and with Yugoslavia in 1927. The cordon sanitaire states were intended as a collective replacement for Imperial Russia as France's chief eastern ally and emerged as areas of French political, military, economic and cultural influence.

It had always been assumed by the states of the cordon sanitaire that a German attack would cause France to respond by starting an offensive into western Germany.

Long before 1933, German military and diplomatic elites had regarded the Rhineland's demilitarized status as only temporary and planned to remilitarize the Rhineland at the first favourable diplomatic opportunity. In December 1918, a meeting of Germany's leading generals (the German Army functioned as a "state within the state") decided that the chief aim would be to rebuild German military power to launch a new war to win the "world power status" that the Germans had unsuccessfully sought in the last war. Throughout the 1920s and the early 1930s, the Reichswehr had been developing plans for a war to destroy France and its ally, Poland, which presumed the remilitarization of the Rhineland. Steps were taken by the German government to prepare for the remilitarization, such as keeping former barracks in a good state of repair, hiding military materials in secret depots and building customs and fire watchtowers along the frontier that could be easily converted to observation and machine gun posts.

From 1919 to 1932, British defense spending was based upon the Ten Year Rule, which assumed that no major war would occur for the next ten years. The policy led to the British military being cut to the bone. In Britain, the idea of the "continental commitment" of sending a large army to fight on the Continental Europe against Germany was never explicitly rejected but was not favored. The memory of the heavy losses taken in World War I had led many to see the 1914 "continental commitment" to have been a serious mistake. For most of the Interwar Period, the British were extremely reluctant to make security commitments in Eastern Europe and regarded the region as one that was so unstable that it was likely to embroil Britain in unwanted wars. At most, Britain was willing to make only limited security commitments in Western Europe, and even then, it tried to avoid the "continental commitment" as much as possible. In 1925, the British Foreign Secretary, Sir Austen Chamberlain, had famously stated in public at Locarno  that the Polish Corridor was "not worth the bones of a single British grenadier". As such, Chamberlain declared that Britain would not guarantee the German-Polish border on the grounds that the Polish Corridor should be returned to Germany. That the British did not take even their Locarno commitments seriously could be seen in Whitehall's prohibition of the British military chiefs from holding staff talks with German, French and Italian militaries on actions if a "flagrant violation" of Locarno occurred. In general, for most of the 1920s and 1930s, British foreign policy was based upon appeasement under which the international system that had been established by Versailles would be reasonably revised in Germany's favor to win German acceptance of that international order to ensure peace. One of the main British aims at Locarno was to create a situation in which Germany could pursue territorial revisionism in Eastern Europe peacefully. The British thought that if Franco-German relations improved, France would gradually abandon the cordon sanitaire.

Once France had abandoned its allies in Eastern Europe as the price of better relations with Germany, the Poles and Czechoslovaks would be forced to adjust to German demands and maintain peace by handing over the territories that were claimed by Germany such as the Sudetenland, the Polish Corridor and the Free City of Danzig (now Gdańsk, Poland). The British tended to exaggerate French power, and even Sir Robert "Van" Vansittart, the Permanent Under-Secretary at the Foreign Office, who was normally pro-French, wrote in 1931 that Britain was faced with an "unbearable" French domination of Europe and that a revival of German power was needed to counterbalance French power.

Whitehall little appreciated France's economic and demographic weaknesses in the face of Germany's strengths. For example, Germany had a much larger population and economy than France and had been little damaged during World War I although France had been devastated.

European situation (1933–1936)

Diplomacy
In March 1933, German Defence Minister General Werner von Blomberg had plans drawn up for remilitarization. In the fall of 1933, he began to provide a number of the paramilitary Landspolizei units in the Rhineland with secret military training and military weapons to prepare for remilitarization. General Ludwig Beck's memo of March 1935 on the need for Germany to secure Lebensraum (living space) in Eastern Europe had accepted that remilitarization should take place once it was diplomatically possible. It was generally believed by German military, diplomatic and political elites that remilitarization would be impossible before 1937.

The change of regime in Germany in January 1933 caused alarm in London, but there was considerable uncertainty about Hitler's long-term intentions, which underscored much of British policy towards Germany until 1939. The British could never quite decide if Hitler wanted merely to reverse Versailles or if he had the unacceptable goal of seeking to dominate Europe. British policy towards Germany was a dual-track policy of seeking a "general settlement" in which "legitimate" German complaints about the Versailles Treaty would be addressed, but the British would rearm to negotiate with Germany from a position of strength, to deter Hitler from choosing war as an option and to ensure that Britain was prepared in the worst case that Hitler really wanted to conquer Europe. In February 1934, a secret report by the Defence Requirements Committee identified Germany as the "ultimate potential enemy" against which British rearmament was to be directed. Although the possibility of German bombing attacks against British cities increased the importance of having a friendly power on the other side of the English Channel, many British decisionmakers were cool, if not downright hostile, towards the idea of the "continental commitment". When British rearmament began in 1934, the army received the lowest priority in terms of funding, after the air force and the navy, which was partly to rule out the option of "continental commitment". Increasingly, the British came to favor the idea of "limited liability" under which if the "continental commitment" were to be made, Britain should send only the smallest-possible expeditionary force to Europe but reserve its main efforts towards the war in the air and on the sea. Britain's refusal to make the continental commitment on the same scale as World War I caused tensions with the French, who believed that it would be impossible to defeat Germany without another large-scale ground force and deeply disliked the idea that they should do the bulk of the fighting on their land.

In 1934, French Foreign Minister Louis Barthou decided to end to any potential German aggression by building a network of alliances that was intended to encircle Germany. He made overtures to the Soviet Union and Italy. Until 1933, the Soviet Union had supported German efforts to challenge the Versailles system, but the strident anticommunism of the German regime and its claim for Lebensraum led the Soviets to change their position toward maintaining the Versailles system. In September 1933, the Soviet Union ended its secret support for German rearmament, which had started in 1921. Under the guise of collective security, Soviet Foreign Commissar Maxim Litvinov started to praise the Versailles system, which the Soviet leaders had denounced as a capitalist plot to "enslave" Germany.

In the 1920s, Italian Prime Minister Benito Mussolini had started to subsidize the right-wing Heimwehr ("Home Defense") movement in Austria, and after Austrian Chancellor Engelbert Dollfuss had seized dictatorial power in March 1933, Austria fell within the Italian sphere of influence. The terrorist campaign mounted by Austrian Nazis, which the Austrian government accused of being supported by Germany, against the reactionary Dollfuss regime had the aim of overthrowing him to achieve the Anschluss, which caused considerable tensions between Rome and Berlin. Mussolini had warned Hitler several times that Austria was within the Italian, not the German, sphere of influence and that the Germans had to cease trying to overthrow Dollfuss, an Italian protégé. On 25 July 1934, the July Putsch in Vienna had seen Dollfuss assassinated by the Austrian SS and an announcement by the Austrian Nazis that the Anschluss was at hand. The Austrian Nazis attempted to seize power all over Austria, and the SS Austrian Legion, based in Bavaria, began to attack frontier posts along the German-Austrian border in what looked like the beginning of an invasion. In response, Mussolini mobilized the Italian Army, concentrated several divisions at the Brenner Pass and warned Hitler that Italy would go to war against Germany if it tried to follow up the Putsch by invading Austria. The Austrian-born Hitler, although deeply offended by Mussolini's blunt assertions that his birthplace was within the sphere of influence of any power other than Germany, realized that he was in no position to do anything except to beat a humiliating retreat. To his disgust, he had to disallow the Putsch that he had ordered and could not follow it up by invading Austria, whose government crushed the Austrian Nazis' coup attempt.

After Barthou was assassinated on 9 October 1934, his work in trying to build anti-German alliances with the Soviet Union and Italy was continued by his successor, Pierre Laval. On 7 January 1935, during a summit in Rome, Laval essentially told Mussolini that Italy had a "free hand" in the Horn of Africa and that France would not oppose an Italian invasion of Abyssinia (now Ethiopia). On 14 April 1935, British Prime Minister Ramsay MacDonald, French Prime Minister Pierre Laval and Italian Prime Minister Benito Mussolini met in Stresa to form the Stresa Front opposing any further German violations of Versailles after Germany stated in March 1935 that it would no longer abide by Parts V or VI of the Versailles Treaty. In the spring of 1935, joint staff talks had begun between France and Italy with the aim of forming an anti-German military alliance. On 2 May 1935, Laval travelled to Moscow, where he a signed a treaty of alliance with Soviet Union. At once, the German government began a violent press campaign against the Franco-Soviet Pact, which claimed it was a violation of Locarno and an immense danger to Germany by encircling it.

In his "peace speech" of May 21, 1935, Adolf Hitler stated, "In particular, they [the Germans] will uphold and fulfill all obligations arising out of the Locarno Treaty, so long as the other parties are on their side ready to stand by that pact". That line in Hitler's speech was written by Foreign Minister Baron Konstantin von Neurath, who wished to reassure foreign leaders who felt threatened by Germany's denunciation in March 1935 of Part V of Versailles, which had disarmed Germany. Meanwhile, Neurath wanted to provide an opening for the eventual remilitarization of the Rhineland and so he hedged the promise to obey Locarno by adding that it was only if other powers did the same. Hitler had always taken the line that Germany did not consider itself bound by the Diktat of Versailles but would respect any treaty that it willingly signed, such as Locarno, under which Germany had promised to keep the Rhineland permanently demilitarized. Thus, Hitler always promised during his "peace speeches" to obey Locarno, not Versailles.

Abyssinia Crisis

On 7 June 1935, MacDonald resigned as British prime minister because of his ailing health and was replaced by Stanley Baldwin. The leadership change did not affect British foreign policy in any meaningful way. On October 3, 1935, Italy invaded Ethiopia (then known as Abyssinia in the West) and thus began the Abyssinia Crisis. Under strong pressure from British public opinion, which was strongly for collective security, the British government took the lead in pressing the League of Nations for sanctions against Italy. The decision of Baldwin to take a strong line for collective security was motivated mostly by domestic politics. Having just won an election on 14 November 1935 with a platform including the upholding collective security, Baldwin's government pressed very strongly for sanctions against Italy for invading Ethiopia. The League Assembly voted for a British motion to impose sanctions on Italy, with immediate effect, on 18 November 1935.

The British line that collective security had to be upheld caused considerable tensions between Paris and London. The French viewed that Hitler, not Mussolini, was the real danger to the peace and so it was worth paying the price to accept the conquest of Ethiopia if that protected the Stresa Front. The British historian Correlli Barnett wrote that for Laval, "all that really mattered was Nazi Germany. His eyes were on the demilitarized zone of the Rhineland; his thoughts on the Locarno guarantees. To estrange Italy, one of the Locarno powers, over such a question as Abyssinia did not appeal to Laval's Auvergnat peasant mind". With Paris and London openly at loggerheads over the correct response to Italian invasion, to say nothing of the very public rift between Rome and London, Germany saw an opening for the remilitarization of the Rhineland.

The dispute placed the French in an uncomfortable position. On one hand, Britain's repeated refusal to make the "continental commitment" increased the value to the French of Italy as the only other nation in Western Europe that could field a large army against Germany. On the other hand, the British economy was far larger than the Italian economy, which meant from the long-term French perspective, Britain was a much better ally as Britain had a vastly-larger economic staying power than Italy for what was assumed would be another guerre de la longue durée ("long-term war") against Germany. The American historian Zach Shore wrote, "French leaders found themselves in the awkward position of seeking the military co-operation of two incompatible allies. Since Italy and Britain had clashing interests in the Mediterranean, France could not ally with one without alienating the other".

To avoid a total rupture with Britain, France failed to use its veto power as a member of the League Council and even voted for the sanctions. However, Laval used the threat of a French veto to soften the sanctions and to have items such as oil and coal, which might have crippled Italy, removed from them.

However, Mussolini felt betrayed by his friends in France, the country for which he blamed most for the sanctions after Britain. Despite his outrage about the sanctions, however, they were largely ineffective. The United States and Germany, both of which were not members of the League, chose not to abide by the sanctions and so American and German businesses supplied Italy with all of the goods that the League had placed on the sanctions list. The Italians thus found the sanction to be more of an annoyance than a problem.

Italian cryptographers had broken the British naval and diplomatic codes in the early 1930s and so Mussolini knew very well that although the British might threaten war through such moves as reinforcing the Mediterranean Fleet in September 1935, they had already decided never to go to war for Ethiopia. Armed with that knowledge, Mussolini felt free to engage in all sorts of wild threats of war against Britain from late 1935 and to declare at one point that he rather see the entire world "go up in a blaze" than to stop his invasion. Mussolini's frequent threats to destroy the British Empire if the British continued to oppose his war in Africa had created the impression in late 1935 to early 1936 that Britain and Italy were on the verge of war.

In late 1935, Neurath started rumors that Germany was considering remilitarizing the Rhineland in response to the Franco-Soviet Pact of May 1935, which Neurath insisted was a violation of Locarno that threatened Germany. Meanwhile, Neurath ordered German diplomats to start drawing up legal briefs justifying the remilitarization under the grounds that the pact violated Locarno. In doing so, Neurath was acting without orders from Hitler but in the expectation that time was ripe for remilitarization because of the crisis in Anglo-Italian relations. To resolve the Abyssinia Crisis, Robert Vansittart, the Permanent Undersecretary at the British Foreign Office, proposed to British Foreign Secretary Samuel Hoare what came to be known as the Hoare–Laval Pact under which half of Ethiopia would be given to Italy, with the rest being nominally independent under Emperor Haile Selassie. Vansittart was a passionate Francophile and an equally-ardent Germanophobe and wanted to sacrifice Ethiopia for the sake of maintaining the Stresa Front against Germany, which he saw as the real danger.

Vansittart had a powerful ally in Hankey, a proponent of realpolitik, who saw the entire idea of imposing sanctions on Italy as much folly. Persuaded of the merits of Vansittart's approach, Hoare traveled to Paris to meet with Laval, who agreed to the plan. However, Alexis St. Leger, the General Secretary at the Quai d'Orsay, was one of the few French officials to have a visceral dislike of Fascist Italy; most of the others were pro-Italian. he decided to sabotage the plan by leaking it to the French press. St. Leger was by all accounts a "rather strange" character and sometimes chose to undercut policy initiatives that he disapproved. In a strange asymmetry, Vansittart was for the French approach that it was worth allowing the Italian conquest to continue the Stresa Front, and St. Leger was for the British approach of upholding collective security even if it risked damaging the Stresa Front. When the news of the plan of essentially rewarding Mussolini reached Britain, such an uproar was caused there that Hoare had to resign in disgrace. He was replaced by Anthony Eden, and the newly-elected Baldwin government was almost toppled by a backbenchers' revolt. Baldwin falsely claimed in the House of Commons that the cabinet had been unaware of the plan and that Hoare had been a rogue minister acting on his own.

In France, public opinion was just as outraged by the plan as in Britain. Laval's policy of internal devaluation of forcing deflation on the French economy to increase French exports to combat the Great Depression had already made him unpopular, but the Hoare-Laval Pact further damaged his reputation. The Chamber of Deputies debated the plan on 27 and 28 December, and the Popular Front condemned it, with Léon Blum telling Laval, "You have tried to give and to keep. You wanted to have your cake and eat it. You canceled your words by your deeds and your deeds by your words. You have debased everything by fixing, intrigue and slickness.... Not sensitive enough to the importance of great moral issues, you have reduced everything to the level of your petty methods".

Mussolini rejected the Hoare-Laval Pact by saying he wanted to subject all of Ethiopia, not just half of it. Following the fiasco of the plan, the British government resumed its previous policy of imposing sanctions against Italy in a half-hearted way, which imposed serious strains on relations with Paris and, especially, Rome. Given the provocative Italian attitude, Britain wanted to begin staff talks with France for a possible war against Italy. On 13 December 1935, Neurath told British Ambassador Sir Eric Phipps that Berlin regarded any Anglo-French staff talks without Germany, even if directed only against Italy, as a violation of Locarno that would force Germany to remilitarize the Rhineland.

Though Italo-German relations had been quite unfriendly in 1935, Germany openly supported the Italian invasion and offered Mussolini a benevolent neutrality. Under the banner of white supremacy and fascism, Hitler came out strongly for the Italian invasion and made a point of shipping the Italians various raw materials and weapons, despite the League's sanctions. Hitler's support for the conquest won him much goodwill in Rome.

By contrast, Laval's pro-Italian intrigues and his efforts to sabotage the British-led effort to impose sanctions on Italy created a lasting climate of distrust between the British and the French.

German remilitarization

Neurath and secret intelligence
The British Foreign Secretary Anthony Eden anticipated that by 1940 Germany might be persuaded to return to the League of Nations, accept arms limitations, and renounce her territorial claims in Europe in exchange for remilitarization of the Rhineland, return of the former German African colonies and German "economic priority along the Danube" The Foreign Office's Ralph Wigram advised that Germany should be permitted to remilitarize the Rhineland in exchange for an "air pact" outlawing bombing and a German promise not to use force to change their borders. However, 'Wigram did not succeed in convincing his colleagues or cabinet ministers'. Eden's goal has been defined as that of a "general settlement", which sought "a return to the normality of the twenties and the creation of conditions in which Hitler could behave like Stresemann" (chancellor, foreign minister and democrat during the Weimar Republic). On 16 January 1936, the French Premier Pierre Laval submitted the Franco-Soviet Pact to the Chamber of Deputies for ratification. In January 1936, during his visit to London to attend the funeral of King George V, Neurath told Eden: "If, however, the other signatories or guarantors of the Locarno Pact should conclude bilateral agreements contrary to the spirit of Locarno Pact, we should be compelled to reconsider our attitude." Eden's response to Neurath's veiled threat that Germany would remilitarize the Rhineland if the French National Assembly ratified the Franco-Soviet pact convinced Neurath that if Germany remilitarized, then Britain would take Germany's side against France. There was a clause in the Locarno treaty calling for binding international arbitration if the one of the signatory powers signed a treaty that the other powers considered to be incompatible with Locarno. Both Neurath and his State Secretary Prince Bernhard von Bülow professed to every foreign diplomat with whom they spoke that the Franco-Soviet Pact was a violation of Locarno, but at the same time both strongly advised Hitler not to seek international arbitration in order to determine whether the Franco-Soviet pact really was a violation of Locarno. Seeking international arbitration was a "lose-lose" situation for Germany: resolving the dispute either way would remove Germany's ability to use it as an excuse for remilitarization. Although Neurath indicated several times in press conferences in early 1936 that Germany was planning on using the arbitration clause in Locarno in order to help convince public opinion abroad that the Franco-Soviet pact was a violation of Locarno, the German government never invoked the arbitration clause.

At the same time, Neurath received an intelligence report on 10 January 1936 from Gottfried Aschmann, the Chief of the Auswärtiges Amt's Press Division, who during a visit to Paris in early January 1936 had talked to a minor French politician named Jean Montiny who was a close friend of Premier Laval, who had frankly mentioned that France's economic problems had retarded French military modernization and that France would do nothing if Germany remilitarized the Rhineland. Neurath did not pass on Aschmann's report to Hitler, but he placed a high value upon it. Neurath was seeking to improve his position within the Nazi regime; by repeatedly assuring Hitler during the Rhineland crisis that the French would do nothing without telling Hitler the source of his self-assurance, Neurath came across as a diplomat blessed with an uncanny intuition, something that improved his standing with Hitler. Traditionally in Germany the conduct of foreign policy had been the work of the Auswärtiges Amt (Foreign Office), but starting in 1933 Neurath had been faced with the threat of Nazi "interlopers in diplomacy" as various NSDAP agencies started to conduct their own foreign policies independent of and often against the Auswärtiges Amt. The most serious of the "interlopers in diplomacy" was the Dienststelle Ribbentrop, a sort of alternative foreign ministry loosely linked to the NSDAP headed by Joachim von Ribbentrop which aggressively sought to undercut the work of the Auswärtiges Amt at every turn. Further exacerbating the rivalry between the Dienststelle Ribbentrop and the Auswärtiges Amt was the fact that Neurath and Ribbentrop utterly hated one another, with Ribbentrop making no secret of his belief that he would be a much better foreign minister than Neurath, whereas Neurath viewed Ribbentrop as a hopelessly inept amateur diplomat meddling in matters that did not concern him.

The decision to remilitarize
During January 1936, the German Chancellor and Führer Adolf Hitler decided to remilitarize the Rhineland. Originally Hitler had planned to remilitarize the Rhineland in 1937, but chose in early 1936 to move re-militarization forward by a year for several reasons, namely: the ratification by the French National Assembly of the Franco-Soviet pact of 1935 allowed him to present his coup both at home and abroad as a defensive move against Franco-Soviet "encirclement"; the expectation that France would be better armed in 1937; the government in Paris had just fallen and a caretaker government was in charge; economic problems at home required a foreign policy success to restore the regime's popularity; the Italo-Ethiopian War, which had set Britain against Italy, had effectively broken up the Stresa Front; and apparently because Hitler simply did not feel like waiting an extra year. In his biography of Hitler, the British historian Sir Ian Kershaw argued that the primary reasons for the decision to remilitarize in 1936 as opposed to 1937 were Hitler's preference for dramatic unilateral coups to obtain what could easily be achieved via quiet talks, and Hitler's need for a foreign policy triumph to distract public attention from the major economic crisis that was gripping Germany in 1935–36.

During a meeting between Prince Bernhard von Bülow, the State Secretary at the Auswärtiges Amt (who is not to be confused with his more famous uncle Chancellor Bernhard von Bülow) and the French Ambassador André François-Poncet on 13 January 1936, where Bülow handed François-Poncet yet another note protesting against the Franco-Soviet pact, François-Poncet accused Bülow to his face of seeking any excuse, no matter how bizarre, strange or implausible to send troops back into the Rhineland. On 15 January 1936, a top-secret NKVD report was sent to Joseph Stalin entitled "Summary of Military and Political Intelligence on Germany", which reported – based on statements from various diplomats in the Auswärtiges Amt – that Germany was planning on remilitarizing the Rhineland in the near-future. The same summary quoted Bülow as saying that if Britain and France made any sort of agreement concerning military co-operation that did not involve Germany: "We would view this as a violation of Locarno, and if we are not dragged into participating in negotiations, we will not consider ourselves bound by Locarno obligations concerning the preservation of the Rhine demilitarized zone". The Soviet report warning of German plans for remilitarization was not passed on to either the British or French governments.

On 17 January 1936 Benito Mussolini – who was angry about the League of Nations sanctions applied against his country for aggression against Ethiopia – told the German Ambassador in Rome, Ulrich von Hassell, that he wanted to see an Austro-German agreement "which would in practice bring Austria into Germany's wake, so that she could pursue no other foreign policy than one parallel with Germany. If Austria, as a formally independent state, were thus in practice to become a German satellite, he would have no objection".

By recognizing that Austria was within the German sphere of influence, Mussolini had removed the principal problem in Italo-German relations. Italo-German relations had been quite bad since mid-1933, and especially since the July Putsch of 1934, so Mussolini's remarks to Hassell in early 1936 indicating that he wanted a rapprochement with Germany were considered extremely significant in Berlin. In another meeting, Mussolini told Hassell that he regarded the Stresa Front of 1935 as "dead", and that Italy would do nothing to uphold Locarno should Germany violate it. Initially German officials did not believe in Mussolini's desire for a rapprochement, but after Hitler sent Hans Frank on a secret visit to Rome carrying a message from the Führer about Germany's support for Italy's actions in the conquest of Ethiopia, Italo-German relations improved markedly. On 24 January, the very unpopular Laval resigned as premier rather than be defeated on a motion of no-confidence in the National Assembly as the Radical Socialists decided to join the left-wing Popular Front, thereby ensuring an anti-Laval majority in the Chamber of Deputies. A caretaker government was formed in Paris led by Albert Sarraut until new elections could be held. The Sarraut cabinet was a mixture of men of the right like Georges Mandel, the center like Georges Bonnet and the left like Joseph Paul-Boncour which made it almost impossible for the cabinet to make decisions. Immediately, the Sarraut government came into conflict with Britain as Eden started to press the League for oil sanctions against Italy, something that the French were completely opposed to, and threatened to veto.

On 11 February 1936, the new French Premier Albert Sarraut affirmed that his government would work for the ratification of the Franco-Soviet pact. On February 12, 1936, Hitler met with Neurath and his Ambassador-at-Large Joachim von Ribbentrop to ask their opinion of the likely foreign reaction to remilitarization. Neurath supported remiltarization, but argued that Germany should negotiate more before doing so whereas Ribbentrop argued for unilateral remilitarization at once. Ribbentrop told Hitler that if France went to war in response to German remiltarization, then Britain would go to war with France, an assessment of the situation with which Neurath did not agree, but one that encouraged Hitler to proceed with remiltarization.

On the 12th of February Hitler informed his War Minister, Field Marshal Werner von Blomberg, of his intentions and asked the head of the Army, General Werner von Fritsch, how long it would take to transport a few infantry battalions and an artillery battery into the Rhineland. Fritsch answered that it would take three days organization but he was in favour of negotiation, as he believed that the German Army was in no state for armed combat with the French Army. The Chief of the General Staff, General Ludwig Beck warned Hitler that the German Army would be unable to successfully defend Germany against a possible retaliatory French attack. Hitler reassured Fritsch that he would withdraw his forces if there were a French countermove. Weinberg wrote that:"German military plans provided for small German units to move into the Rhineland, joining the local militarized police (Landespolizei) and staging a fighting withdrawal if there were a military counter-action from the West. The story that the Germans had orders to withdraw if France moved against them is partially correct, but essentially misleading; the withdrawal was to be a tactical defensive move, not a return to the earlier position. The possibility of a war was thus accepted by Hitler, but he clearly did not think the contingency very likely." The operation was codenamed Winter Exercise.

Unknown to Hitler, on 14 February Eden had written to the Quai d'Orsay stating that Britain and France should "enter betimes into negotiations...for the surrender on conditions of our rights in the zone while such surrender still has got a bargaining value". Eden wrote to the British cabinet that the end of the demilitarized zone would "not merely change local military values, but is likely to lead to far-reaching political repercussions of a kind which will further weaken France's influence in Central and Eastern Europe". In February 1936, the Deuxième Bureau started to submit reports suggesting that Germany was planning on sending troops into the Rhineland in the very near-future. Because François-Poncet's reports from Berlin indicated that the German economic situation was quite precarious, it was felt in Paris that sanctions against Germany could be quite devastating, and might even lead to the collapse of the Nazi regime.

Along with Ribbentrop and Neurath, Hitler discussed the planned remilitarization in detail with War Minister General Werner von Blomberg, Chief of General Staff General Ludwig Beck, Hermann Göring, Army Commander-in-Chief General Werner von Fritsch and Ulrich von Hassell. Ribbentrop and Blomberg were in favor; Beck and Fritsch were opposed and Neurath and Hassell were supportive, but argued that there was no real need to act now as quiet diplomacy would soon ensure remilitarization. That Hitler was in close and regular contact with Hassell, the ambassador to Italy all through February and early March, showed how much importance Hitler attached to Italy. Of the three leaders of the Stresa front, Mussolini was easily the one Hitler most respected, and so Hitler viewed Italy as the key, taking the view that if Mussolini decided to oppose the remilitarization, then Britain and France would follow. Not withstanding Mussolini's remarks in January, Hitler was still not convinced of Italian support, and ordered Hassell to find out Mussolini's attitude. On 22 February, Hassell wrote in his diary that the pending ratification of the Franco-Soviet pact was just a pretext, writing: "it was quite clear that he [Hitler] really wanted the ratification to use as a platform for his action". That same day, Hassell held a meeting with Mussolini, where Il Duce stated if oil sanctions were applied against Italy, he would "make Locarno disappear of its own accord", and that anyhow Italy would not act if German troops were to enter the Rhineland.

At the same time, Neurath started preparing elaborate documents justifying remilitarization as a response forced on Germany by the Franco-Soviet pact, and advised Hitler to keep the number of troops sent into the Rhineland very small so to allow the Germans to claim that they had not committed a "flagrant violation" of Locarno (both Britain and Italy were only committed to offering a military response to a "flagrant violation"). In the statement justifying remilitarization that Neurath prepared for the foreign press, the German move was portrayed as something forced on a reluctant Germany by ratification of the Franco-Soviet pact, and strongly hinted that Germany would return to the League of Nations if remilitarization was accepted. After meeting with Hitler on 18 February, Baron von Neurath expressed the viewpoint "for Hitler in the first instance domestic motives were decisive".

At the same time that Frank was visiting Rome, Göring had been dispatched to Warsaw to meet the Polish Foreign Minister Colonel Józef Beck and to ask the Poles to remain neutral if France decided on war in response to the remilitarization of the Rhineland. Colonel Beck believed that the French would do nothing if Germany remilitarized the Rhineland, and thus could assure those in the Polish government who wished for Poland to stay close to its traditional ally France that Poland would act if France did while at the same time telling Göring that he wanted closer German-Polish relations and would do nothing in the event of remilitarization.

On 13 February 1936 during a meeting with Prince Bismarck of the German Embassy in London, Ralph Wigram, the head of the Central Department of the British Foreign Office stated that the British government (whose Prime Minister from 1935 to 1937 was Stanley Baldwin) wanted a "working agreement" on an air pact that would outlaw bombing, and that Britain would consider revising Versailles and Locarno in Germany's favor for an air pact. Prince Bismarck reported to Berlin that Wigram had hinted quite strongly that the "things" that Britain were willing to consider revising included remilitarization. On 22 February 1936 Mussolini, who was still angry about the League of Nations sanctions applied against his country for aggression against Ethiopia, told von Hassell that Italy would not honour Locarno if Germany were to remilitarize the Rhineland.  Even if Mussolini had wanted to honour Locarno, practical problems would have arisen as the bulk of the Italian Army was at that time engaged in the conquest of Ethiopia, and as there is no common Italo-German frontier.

Historians debate the relation between Hitler's decision to remilitarize the Rhineland in 1936 and his broad long-term goals. Those historians who favour an "intentionist" interpretation of German foreign policy such as Klaus Hildebrand and the late Andreas Hillgruber see the Rhineland remilitarization as only one "stage" of Hitler's stufenplan (stage by stage plan) for world conquest. Those historians who take a "functionist" interpretation see the Rhineland remilitarization more as ad hoc, improvised response on the part of Hitler to the economic crisis of 1936 as a cheap and easy way of restoring the regime's popularity. The British Marxist historian Timothy Mason famously argued that Hitler's foreign policy was driven by domestic needs related to a failing economy, and that it was economic problems at home as opposed to Hitler's "will" or "intentions" that drove Nazi foreign policy from 1936 onwards, which ultimately degenerated into a “barbaric variant of social imperialism", which led to a "flight into war" in 1939.

As Hildebrand himself has noted, these interpretations are not necessarily mutually exclusive. Hildebrand has argued that although Hitler did have a "programme" for world domination, the way in which Hitler attempted to execute his "programme" was highly improvised and much subject to structural factors both on the international stage and domestically that were often not under Hitler's control. On February 26 the French National Assembly ratified the Franco-Soviet pact. On February 27, Hitler had lunch with Hermann Göring and Joseph Goebbels to discuss the planned remilitarization, with Goebbels writing in his diary afterwards: "Still somewhat too early". On February 29 an interview Hitler had on February 21 with the French fascist and journalist Bertrand de Jouvenel was published in the newspaper Paris-Midi. During his interview with a clearly admiring de Jouvenel, Hitler professed himself a man of peace who desperately wanted friendship with France and blamed all of the problems in Franco-German relations on the French who for some strange reason were trying to "encircle" Germany via the Franco-Soviet pact, despite the evident fact that the Fuhrer was not seeking to threaten France. Hitler's interview with de Jouvenel was intended to influence French public opinion into believing that it was their government that was responsible for the remilitarization. Only on March 1 did Hitler finally make up his mind to proceed. A further factor in Hitler's decision was that the sanctions committee of the League was due to start discussing possible oil sanctions against Italy on 2 March, something that was likely to lead the diplomats of Europe to be focused on the Abyssinia Crisis at the expense of everything else.

The Wehrmacht marches
Not long after dawn on March 7, 1936, nineteen German infantry battalions and a handful of planes entered the Rhineland. By doing so, Germany violated Articles 42 and 43 of the Treaty of Versailles and Articles 1 and 2 of the Treaty of Locarno. They reached the river Rhine by 11:00 a.m. and then three battalions crossed to the west bank of the Rhine. At the same time, Baron von Neurath summoned the Italian ambassador Baron Bernardo Attolico, the British ambassador Sir Eric Phipps and the French ambassador André François-Poncet to the Wilhelmstrasse to hand them notes accusing France of violating Locarno by ratifying the Franco-Soviet pact, and announcing that as such Germany had decided to renounce Locarno and remilitarize the Rhineland.

When German reconnaissance learned that thousands of French soldiers were congregating on the Franco-German border, General Blomberg begged Hitler to evacuate the German forces. Under Blomberg's influence, Hitler nearly ordered the German troops to withdraw, but was then persuaded by the resolutely calm Neurath to continue with Operation Winter Exercise. Following Neurath's advice, Hitler inquired whether the French forces had actually crossed the border and when informed that they had not, he assured Blomberg that Germany would wait until this happened. In marked contrast to Blomberg who was highly nervous during Operation Winter Exercise, Neurath stayed calm and very much urged Hitler to stay the course.

The Rhineland coup is often seen as the moment when Hitler could have been stopped with very little effort; the German forces involved in the move were small, compared to the much larger, and at the time more powerful, French military. The American journalist William L. Shirer wrote if the French had marched into the Rhineland,

A German officer assigned to the Bendlerstrasse during the crisis told H. R. Knickerbocker during the Spanish Civil War: "... we knew that if the French marched, we were done. We had no fortifications, and no army to match the French. If the French had even mobilized, we should have been compelled to retire." The general staff, the officer said, considered Hitler's action suicidal. General Heinz Guderian, a German general interviewed by French officers after the Second World War, claimed: "If you French had intervened in the Rhineland in 1936 we should have been sunk and Hitler would have fallen."

That Hitler faced serious opposition gains apparent weight from the fact that Ludwig Beck and Werner von Fritsch did indeed become opponents of Hitler but according to the American historian Ernest R. May there is not a scrap of evidence for this at this stage.  May wrote that the German Army officer corps was all for remilitarizing the Rhineland, and only the question of timing of such a move divided them from Hitler. 

Writing about relations between Hitler and his generals in early 1936, the American historian J.T. Emerson declared: "In fact, at no time during the twelve-year existence of the Third Reich did Hitler enjoy more amicable relations with his generals than in 1935 and 1936. During these years, there was nothing like an organized military resistance to party politics". Later on in World War II, despite the increasing desperate situation of Germany from 1942 onwards and a whole series of humiliating defeats, the overwhelming majority of the Wehrmacht stayed loyal to the Nazi regime and continued to fight hard for that regime right up to its destruction in 1945 (the only exception being the putsch of July 20, 1944, in which only a minority of the Wehrmacht rebelled while the majority remained loyal). The willingness of the Wehrmacht to continue to fight and die hard for the National Socialist regime despite the fact Germany was clearly losing the war from 1943 onwards reflected the deep commitment of most of the Wehrmacht to National Socialism.

Furthermore, the senior officers of the Wehrmacht were deeply corrupt men, who received huge bribes from Hitler in exchange for their loyalty. Given the intense devotion of the Wehrmacht to the National Socialist regime and its corrupt senior officers, it is unlikely  the Wehrmacht would have turned on their Fuhrer if the Wehrmacht were forced out of the Rhineland in 1936.

Reactions

Germany

On 7 March 1936 Hitler announced before the Reichstag that the Rhineland had been remilitarized, and to blunt the danger of war, Hitler offered to return to the League of Nations, to sign an air pact to outlaw bombing as a way of war, and a non-aggression pact with France if the other powers agreed to accept the remilitarization. In his address to the Reichstag, Hitler began with a lengthy denunciation of the Treaty of Versailles as unfair to Germany, claimed that he was a "man of peace who wanted war with no-one", and argued that he was only seeking equality for Germany by peacefully overturning the supposedly unfair Treaty of Versailles. Hitler claimed that it was unfair that because of Versailles a part of Germany should be demilitarized whereas in every other nation of the world a government could order its troops to anywhere within its borders, and claimed all he wanted was "equality" for Germany. 

Even then, Hitler claimed that he would have been willing to accept the continued demilitarization of the Rhineland as Stresemann had promised at Locarno in 1925 as the price for peace, had it not been for the Franco-Soviet Pact of 1935, which he maintained was threatening to Germany and had left him with no other choice than to remilitarize the Rhineland. With his eye on public opinion abroad, Hitler made a point of stressing that the remilitarization was not intended to threaten anyone else, but was instead only a defensive measure imposed on Germany by what he claimed were the menacing actions of France and the Soviet Union. At least some people abroad accepted Hitler's claim that he been forced to take this step because of the Franco-Soviet pact. Former British Prime Minister David Lloyd George stated in the House of Commons that Hitler's actions in the wake of the Franco-Soviet pact were fully justified, and he would have been a traitor to Germany if he had not protected his country.

When German troops marched into Cologne, a vast cheering crowd formed spontaneously to greet the soldiers, throwing flowers onto the Wehrmacht while Catholic priests offered to bless the soldiers. In Germany, the news that the Rhineland had been remilitarized was greeted with wild celebrations all over the country; the British historian Sir Ian Kershaw wrote of March 1936 that: "People were besides themselves with delight … It was almost impossible not to be caught up in the infectious mood of joy". Reports to the Sopade in the spring of 1936 mentioned that a great many erstwhile Social Democrats and opponents of the Nazis amongst the working class had nothing but approval of the remilitarization, and that many who had once been opposed to the Nazis under the Weimar Republic were now beginning to support  them.

To capitalize on the vast popularity of the remilitarization, Hitler called a referendum on 29 March 1936 in which the majority of German voters expressed their approval of the remilitarization. During his campaign stops to ask for a yes vote, Hitler was greeted with huge crowds roaring their approval of his defiance of Versailles. Kershaw wrote that the 99% ja (yes) vote in the referendum was improbably high, but it is clear that an overwhelming majority of voters did genuinely chose to vote yes when asked if they approved of the remilitarization.  

 In the aftermath of the remilitarization, the economic crisis which had so damaged the National Socialist regime's popularity was forgotten by almost all. After the Rhineland triumph, Hitler's self-confidence surged to new heights, and those who knew him well stated that after March 1936 there was a real psychological change as Hitler was utterly convinced of his infallibility in a way that he not been before.

France

Historians writing without benefit of access to the French archives (which were not opened until the mid-1970s) such as William L. Shirer in his books The Rise and Fall of the Third Reich (1960) and The Collapse of the Third Republic (1969) have claimed that France, although possessing at this time superior armed forces compared to Germany, including after a possible mobilization 100 infantry divisions, was psychologically unprepared to use force against Germany. Shirer quoted the figure of France having 100 divisions compared to Germany's 19 battalions in the Rhineland. France's actions during the Rhineland crisis have often used as support of the décadence thesis that during the interwar period the supposed decadence of the French way of life caused the French people to degenerate physically and morally to the point that the French were simply unable to stand up to Hitler, and the French in some way "had it coming when they were defeated in 1940". Shirer wrote that the French could have easily turned back the German battalions in the Rhineland had the French people not been "sinking into defeatism" in 1936. Historians such as the American historian Stephen A. Schuker who have examined the relevant French primary sources have rejected Shirer's claims, finding that a major paralyzing factor on French policy was the economic situation. France's top military official, General Maurice Gamelin, informed the French government that the only way to remove the Germans from the Rhineland was to mobilize the French Army, which would not only be unpopular but also cost the French treasury 30 million francs per day. Gamelin assumed a worst-case scenario in which a French move into the Rhineland would spark an all-out Franco-German war, a case that required full mobilization. Gamelin's analysis was supported by the War Minister, General Louis Maurin who told the Cabinet that it was inconceivable that France could reverse the German remilitarization without full mobilization. This was especially the case as the Deuxième Bureau had seriously exaggerated the number of German troops in the Rhineland when it sent in a report to the French cabinet estimating that there were 295,000 German troops in the Rhineland. The Deuxième Bureau had come up with this estimate by counting all of the SS, SA and Landespolizei formations in the Rhineland as regular troops and so the French believed that only a full mobilization would allow France to have enough troops to expel the alleged 295,000 German troops from the Rhineland. The real number was actually 3,000 German soldiers. The French historian Jean-Baptiste Duroselle accused Gamelin of distorting what the Deuxième Bureau'''s intelligence in his report to the cabinet by converting the SS, SA and Landespolizei  units into fully-trained troops to provide a reason for inaction. Neurath's truthful statement that Germany had sent only 19 battalions into the Rhineland was dismissed by Gamelin as a ruse to allow the Germans to claim that they had not committed a "flagrant violation" of Locarno to avoid having it invoked against Germany, and he also claimed that Hitler would never risk a war by sending such a small force into the Rhineland.  

At the same time, in late 1935 to early 1936 France was gripped by a financial crisis, with the French Treasury informing the government that sufficient cash reserves to maintain the value of the franc as currently pegged by the gold standard in regard to the US dollar and the British pound no longer existed, and only a huge foreign loan on the money markets of London and New York could prevent the value of the franc from experiencing a disastrous downfall. Because France was on the verge of elections scheduled for the spring of 1936, devaluation of the franc, which was viewed as abhorrent by large sections of French public opinion, was rejected by the caretaker government of Prime Minister Albert Sarraut as politically unacceptable. Investors' fears of a war with Germany were not conducive to raising the necessary loans to stabilize the franc, and the German remilitarization of the Rhineland, by sparking fears of war, worsened the French economic crisis by causing a massive cash flow out of France, with worried investors shifting their savings towards what were felt to be safer foreign markets. The fact that France had defaulted on its World War I debts in 1932 understandably led most investors to conclude that the same would occur if France was involved in another war with Germany,. On March 18, 1936, Wilfrid Baumgartner, the director of the Mouvement général des fonds (the French equivalent of a permanent under-secretary) reported to the government that France, for all intents and purposes, was bankrupt. Only by desperate arm-twisting from the major French financial institutions could Baumgartner manage to obtain enough in the way of short-term loans to prevent France from defaulting on its debts and to keeping the value of the franc from sliding too far, in March 1936. Given the financial crisis, the French government feared that there were insufficient funds to cover the costs of mobilization and that a full-blown war scare caused by mobilization would only exacerbate the financial crisis. The American historian Zach Shore wrote, "It was not lack of French will to fight in 1936 which permitted Hitler's coup, but rather France's lack of funds, military might, and therefore operational plans to counter German remilitarization".

An additional issue for the French was the state of the French Air Force. The Deuxième Bureau reported that the Luftwaffe had developed considerably more advanced aircraft than what France had and that the superior productivity of German industry and the considerably-larger German economy gave the Luftwaffe had a three-to-one advantage in fighters. Problems with productivity in the French aircraft industry meant the French Air Force would have a great deal of trouble replacing its losses in the event of combat with the Luftwaffe. Thus, it was believed by the French military elite that if war came, the Luftwaffe would dominate the skies, attack French troops marching into the Rhineland and even bomb French cities. Yet another problem for the French were the attitudes of the states of the cordon sanitaire. Since 1919, it had accepted that France needed the alliance system in Eastern Europe to provide additional manpower (Germany's population was one-and-half times that of France's) and to open up an eastern front against the Reich. Without the other states of the cordon sanitaire, it was believed impossible for France to defeat Germany. Only Czechoslovakia indicated firmly that it would go to war with Germany if France marched into the Rhineland. Poland, Romania and Yugoslavia all indicated that they would go to war only if German soldiers entered France. French public opinion and newspapers were very hostile towards the German coup, but few called for war. Most French newspapers called for League of Nations sanctions to be imposed on the Reich to inflict economically-crippling costs force the German Army out of the Rhineland and for France to build new and to reinforce existing alliances to prevent further German challenges to the international status quo. One of the few newspapers to support Germany was the royalist Action Française, which ran a banner headline reading: "The Republic Has Assassinated the Peace!" and went on to say that the German move was justified by the Franco-Soviet Pact. On the other ideological extreme, the communists issued a statement calling for national unity against "those who would lead us to carnage" who were the "Laval clique", which was allegedly pushing for a war with Germany, which would supposedly be good for capitalism.

Upon hearing of the German move, the French government issued a statement strongly hinting that military action was a possible option. From 9:30 am to noon on 7 March, a meeting of the French cabinet took place to discuss what to do; it ended with the conclusion that the French Foreign Minister, Pierre Étienne Flandin, should meet the ambassadors of the other Locarno powers to discuss their reaction. Georges Mandel was the sole voice in the French cabinet demanding France to march at once into the Rhineland to expel the German troops, regardless of the costs. Later that day, another cabinet meeting was called with General-Secretary Alexis St. Leger, representing the Quai d'Orsay and Maurice Gamelin, who represented the military. Both decided to issue a statement that France reserved every option to oppose the remilitarization. Flandin, upon hearing of the remilitarization, immediately went to London to consult British Prime Minister Stanley Baldwin, as Flandin wished, for domestic political reasons, to find a way of shifting the onus of not taking action onto British shoulders. Baldwin asked Flandin what the French government had in mind, but Flandin said that it had not yet decided. Flandin went back to Paris and asked the French government what its response should be. They agreed, "France would place all her forces at the disposal of the League of Nations to oppose a violation of the Treaties". On 8 March, Prime Minister Albert Sarraut went on French radio to state: "In the name of the French government, I declare that we intend to see maintained that essential guarantee of French and Belgian security, countersigned by the English and Italian governments, constituted by the Treaty of Locarno. We are not disposed to allow Strasbourg to come under fire from German guns". At the same time, the French cabinet had decided, "We will put all our forces, material and moral, at the disposal of the League of Nations... on the one condition that we shall be accompanied in the fight for peace by those who are clearly bound themselves to do so by the Rhineland pact". In other words, France would act against Germany only if Britain and Italy did likewise.

Since the French government, for economic reasons, had already ruled out mobilization and war as a way of reversing Hitler's Rhineland coup, it was decided that the best that France could do under the situation was to use the crisis to obtain the "continental commitment", a British commitment to send large ground forces to the defense of France on the same scale of World War I. The strategy of Flandin strongly implied to the British that France was willing to go to war with Germany over the Rhineland issue, in the expectation that the British did not want to see their Locarno commitments lead them into a war with the Germans over an issue in which many British supported the Germans. As such, Flandin expected that London to apply pressure for "restraint" on Paris. The price of the French "restraint" in regards to the Rhineland provocation, an open violation of both the Versailles and Locarno Treaties, would be the British "continental commitment" unequivocally linking British security to French security and committing the British to send another large expeditionary force to defend France against a German attack.

During his visit to London to consult with British Prime Minister Stanley Baldwin and Foreign Secretary Anthony Eden, Flandin carried out what the Canadian historian Robert J. Young called "the performance of a lifetime" in which he expressed a great deal of outrage at the German move, stated quite openly that France was prepared to go to war over the issue and strongly criticised his British hosts for the demands for French "restraint". However, he failed to not offer to do anything for French sécurité (security). As expected by Flandin, Eden was opposed to the French taking military action and appealed for French "restraint". Not aware of what Flandin was attempting to do, French military officials urged the government to tell Flandin to tone down his language. In the face of Flandin's tactics, on March 19, 1936, the British government made a vague statement linking British security to French security, and for the first time since World War I, it agreed to Anglo-French staff talks albeit of very limited scope. Though disappointed with the British offers, which the French felt were too little, the French considered the pledges of British support gained in 1936 to be a worthwhile achievement, especially since economic reasons mobilization was not considered a realistic option in 1936. Those French officials such as Quai d'Orsay's directeur politique (political director), René Massigli, who believed in the idea of an Anglo-French alliance as the best way of stopping German expansionism expressed a great deal of disappointment that Britain was not prepared to do more for French sécurité. In a report to Flandin, Massigli warned that if French accepted remilitarization, the Poles, the Yugoslavs and the Romanians would drift into the German orbit, and the Czechoslovaks would do their best to stay loyal to the 1924 alliance with France, and it would only be a matter of time before Germany annexed Austria. In particular, Massigli warned that if the Germans could fortify the Rhineland, they would essentially be given a free hand to expand into Eastern Europe. As part of an effort to secure more in the way of the long-desired "continental commitment" that had been a major goal of French foreign policy since 1919, Gamelin told the British military attaché:

The generalissimo of the French Army, Maurice Gamelin, told the French government that if France countered the German forces, France would be unable to win fighting alone in a long war and so would need British assistance. The French government, with an upcoming general election in mind, decided against general mobilization of the French Army. Remilitarization removed the last hold France had over Germany and so ended the security that France had gained from the Treaty of Versailles. As long as the Rhineland was demilitarized, the French could easily reoccupy the area and threaten the economically-important Ruhr industrial area, which was liable to an invasion if France believed the German situation ever became a threat.

United Kingdom

The reaction in Britain was mixed, but they did not generally regard the remilitarization as harmful. Lord Lothian famously said it was no more than the Germans walking into their own backyard. George Bernard Shaw similarly claimed it was no different than if Britain had reoccupied Portsmouth. In his diary entry for 23 March, Harold Nicolson, MP noted that "the feeling in the House [of Commons] is terribly pro-German, which means afraid of war". During the Rhineland crisis of 1936, no public meetings or rallies were held anywhere in protest at the remilitarization of the Rhineland, and instead there were several "peace" rallies where it was demanded that Britain not use war to resolve the crisis. Ever since the economist John Maynard Keynes had published his best-selling  book The Economic Consequences of the Peace in 1919—in which Keynes depicted Versailles as an unbearably harsh Carthaginian peace imposed by the vindictive Allies—an increasingly large segment of British public opinion had become convinced that the Treaty of Versailles was deeply "unjust" to Germany. By 1936, when German troops marched back into the Rhineland, the majority of British people believed that Hitler was right to violate the "unjust" Versailles treaty, and it would be morally wrong for Britain to go to war to uphold the "unjust" Treaty of Versailles. The British War Secretary Alfred Duff Cooper told the German Ambassador Leopold von Hoesch on 8 March: "through the British people were prepared to fight for France in the event of a German incursion into French territory, they would not resort to arms on account of the recent occupation of the Rhineland. The people did not know much about the demilitarization provisions and most of them probably took the view that they did not care 'two hoots' about the Germans reoccupying their own territory".

The Prime Minister Stanley Baldwin claimed that Britain lacked the resources to enforce her treaty guarantees and that public opinion would not stand for military force. The British Chiefs of Staff had warned that war with Germany was inadvisable due to the deep cuts imposed by the Ten Year Rule and that rearmament had only begun in 1934, which meant that the most Britain could do in the event of war would be to send two divisions with obsolete equipment to  France after three weeks of preparation. Fears were also expressed in Whitehall that if Britain went to war with Germany,  Japan might take advantage of the war to start seizing Britain's Asian colonies.

The British Foreign Secretary, Anthony Eden, discouraged military action by the French and was against any financial or economic sanctions against Germany, immediately meeting the French ambassador Charles Corbin to urge restraint on the French. Eden instead wanted Germany to pull out all but a symbolic number of troops, the number they said they were going to put in the first place, and then renegotiate.  An additional factor that influenced British policy was the lack of the Dominion support. All of the Dominion High Commissioners in London, with South Africa and Canada being especially outspoken in this regard, made it quite clear that they would not go to war to restore the demilitarized status of the Rhineland, and that if Britain did so, she would be on her own. The American historian Gerhard Weinberg wrote that "...by 13 March that the British Dominions, especially the Union of South Africa and Canada, would not stand with England if war came. The South African government in particular was busy backing the German position in London and with the other Dominion governments". Both the South African Prime Minister General J. B. M. Hertzog and the Canadian Prime Minister William Lyon Mackenzie King had to face domestic constituencies, respectively the Afrikaners and the French Canadians, many of whom had deep objections to fighting in another "British war" against Germany, and as such both Hertzog and Mackenzie King were staunch supporters of appeasement as the best way of avoiding such a war. Neither Hertzog nor Mackenzie King wished to have chosen between loyalty to the British Empire vs. dealing with anti-British voters if war came. Ever since the Chanak Crisis of 1922, Britain had been keenly conscious that Dominion support could no longer be automatically assumed, and remembering the huge role the Dominions had played in the victory of 1918, could not consider fighting another major war without Dominion support.

The British Foreign Office for its part expressed a great deal of frustration over Hitler's action in unilaterally taking what London had proposed to negotiate.  As a Foreign Office memo complained: "Hitler has deprived us of the possibility of making to him a concession which might otherwise have been a useful bargaining counter in our hands in the general negotiations with Germany which we had it in contemplation to initiate". The Rhineland crisis completed the estrangement between Eden who believed that Hitler's proposals in his speech of 7 March were the grounds for a "general settlement" with Germany, and Vansittart who argued that Hitler was negotiating in bad faith. Eden and Vansittart had already clashed during the Abyssinia Crisis with Eden supporting sanctions against Italy while Vansittart wanted Italy as an ally against Germany. Vansittart argued that there was no prospect of a "general settlement" with Hitler, and the best that could be done was to strengthen ties with the French in order to confront Germany. The Germanophobe Vansittart had always hated the Germans, and especially disliked the Nazis, whom he saw as a menace to civilization. Vansittart had supported Eden's efforts to defuse the Rhineland crisis as British rearmament had only just began, but being an intense Francophile Vansittart urged the government to use the crisis as a chance to begin forming a military alliance with France against Germany. By the spring of 1936, Vansittart had become convinced that a "general settlement" with Germany was not possible, and Hitler was seeking the conquest of the world. A Foreign Office official Owen O'Malley suggested that Britain give Germany a "free hand in the East" (i.e. accept the German conquest of all Eastern Europe) in exchange for a German promise to accept the status quo in Western Europe. Vansittart wrote in response that Hitler was seeking world conquest, and that to allow Germany to conquer all of Eastern Europe would give the Reich sufficient raw materials to make Germany immune to a British blockade, which would then allow the Germans to overrun Western Europe. Vansittart commented that to allow Germany to conquer Eastern Europe would "lead to the disappearance of liberty and democracy in Europe". By contrast, Eden saw British interests as confined only to Western Europe, and did not share Vansittart's beliefs about what Hitler's ultimate intentions might be. Nor did Eden, the rest of the Cabinet or the majority of the British people share Vansittart's conviction that Britain could not afford to be indifferent about Eastern Europe.

Though the British had agreed to staff talks with the French as the price of French "restraint", many British ministers were unhappy with these talks. The Home Secretary Sir John Simon wrote to Eden and Baldwin that staff talks to be held with the French after the Rhineland remilitarization would lead the French to perceive that:

In response to objections like Simon's, the British ended the staff talks with the French five days after they had begun; Anglo-French staff talks were not to occur again until February 1939 in the aftermath of the Dutch War Scare of January 1939. Besides opposition within the cabinet, the Anglo-French staff talks generated furious criticism from David Lloyd George and the Beaverbrook and Rothermere press who fumed, as the Daily Mail put it in a leader, over "military arrangements that will commit us to some war at the call of others". Furthermore, Hitler's Extraordinary Ambassador-at-Large Joachim von Ribbentrop had warned Baldwin and Eden that Germany regarded the Anglo-French staff talks as a mortal threat, and any hope of a "general settlement" with Germany would end forever if the talks continued. However, the rather hazily phrased British statement linking British security to French sécurité was not disallowed out of the fear that it would irreparably damage Anglo-French relations, which as the British historian A. J. P. Taylor observed, meant should France become involved in a war with Germany, there would be at a minimum a strong moral case because of the statement of March 19, 1936 for Britain to fight on the side of France.

Until the statement by Neville Chamberlain on March 31, 1939 offering the "guarantee" of Poland, there were no British security commitments in Eastern Europe beyond the Covenant of the League of Nations. However, because of the French alliance system in Eastern Europe, the so-called Cordon sanitaire, any German attack on France's Eastern European allies would cause a Franco-German war, and because of the statement of March 19, 1936 a Franco-German war would create strong pressure for British intervention on the side of France. This was all the more the case because unlike the Locarno, where Britain was committed to come to France's defence only in the event of a German attack, the British statement of March 19 as part of an effort to be as vague as possible only stated Britain considered French security to be a vital national need, and did not distinguish between a German attack on France vs. France going to war with Germany in the event of a German attack on a member of the cordon sanitarie. Thus, in this way, the British statement of March 1936 offered not only a direct British commitment to defend France (albeit phrased in exceedingly ambiguous language), but also indirectly to the Eastern European states of the cordon sanitaire. In this way, the British government found itself drawn into the Central European crisis of 1938 because the Franco-Czechoslovak alliance of 1924 meant any German-Czechoslovak war would automatically become a Franco-German war. It was because of this indirect security commitment that the British involved themselves in the Central European crisis of 1938, despite the widespread feeling that the German-Czechoslovak dispute did not concern Britain directly.

During a House of Commons Foreign Affairs Committee meeting on 12 March, Winston Churchill, a backbench Conservative MP, argued for Anglo-French co-ordination under the League of Nations to help France challenge the remilitarization of the Rhineland, but this never happened. On 6 April Churchill said of the remilitarization, "The creation of a line of forts opposite to the French frontier will enable the German troops to be economized on that line and will enable the main forces to swing round through Belgium and Holland", accurately predicting the Battle of France.

Belgium
Belgium concluded an alliance with France in 1920 but after the remilitarization Belgium opted again for neutrality. On 14 October 1936 King Leopold III of Belgium said in a speech:

 Since the leaders of Germany knew well that neither Britain nor France would violate Belgian neutrality, the declaration of Belgian neutrality effectively meant that there was no more danger of an Allied offensive in the West should Germany start another war as the Germans were now busy building the Siegfried Line along their border with France. By contrast, just as before 1914, Germany's leaders were all too willing to violate Belgian neutrality. Belgian neutrality meant there could be no staff talks between the Belgian military and those of other nations, which meant that when German forces invaded Belgium in 1940, there were no plans whatsoever for coordinating the movement of Belgian forces with those of France and Britain, which gave the Germans a head-start in their offensive.

Poland

Poland, announced that the Franco-Polish Military Alliance signed in 1921 would be honoured, although the treaty stipulated that Poland would aid France only if France was invaded. At the same time that Colonel Beck was assuring the French ambassador Léon Noël of his commitment to the Franco-Polish alliance and Poland's willingness to stand with France, he was also telling the German ambassador Count Hans-Adolf von Moltke that since Germany was not planning on invading France, the Franco-Polish alliance would not come into effect and Poland would do nothing if France acted. Beck made a point of stressing to Moltke that Poland had not been allowed to sign Locarno and would not go to war for Locarno, and that as one of the architects of the German-Polish nonaggression pact of 1934 that he was a friend of the Reich. Beck told Moltke on 9 March that his promise to go to war with France was "in practice, without effect" because it only came into effect if German troops entered France. Weinberg wrote that Beck's "duplicity" during the Rhineland crisis of telling the German and French ambassadors different things about what Poland would do "… did nothing for Beck's personal reputation and involved enormous risks …" for Poland. Poland did agree to mobilize its forces if France did first, however they abstained from voting against the remilitarization in the Council of the League of Nations.

United States
During the Rhineland crisis, the isolationist American government took a strict "hands off" policy of doing nothing. During the crisis, President Franklin D. Roosevelt went off on a "diplomatically convenient" extended fishing trip to Florida to avoid having to answer questions from journalists about what his administration planned to do in response to the crisis in Europe. The general sentiment within the U.S. government was expressed by Truman Smith, the American military attaché in Berlin who wrote that Hitler was seeking only to end French domination in Europe, and was not seeking to destroy France as a power. Smith's report concluded: "Versailles is dead. There may possibly be a German catastrophe and a new Versailles, but it will not be the Versailles which has hung like a dark cloud over Europe since 1920".

The Soviet Union
In public, the Soviet government took a strong line in denouncing the German coup as a threat to peace. At the same time the Soviet Foreign Commissar Maxim Litvinov was giving speeches before the General Assembly of the League of Nations praising collective security and urging the world to oppose Hitler's coup, Soviet diplomats in Berlin were telling their counterparts at the Auswärtiges Amt of their desire for better commercial relations, which in turn might lead to better political relations. Just after the remilitarization, the Soviet Premier Vyacheslav Molotov gave an interview with the Swiss newspaper Le Temps hinting that the Soviet Union wanted better relations with Germany. In April 1936, the Soviet Union signed a commercial treaty with Germany providing for expanded German-Soviet trade. A major problem for the Soviet Union to go to war with Germany was the lack of a common German-Soviet frontier, which would require both the Polish and Romanian governments to grant transit right to the Red Army. Despite their professed willingness to engage with the Wehrmacht, the Narkomindel tended to negotiate with the Poles and the Romanians over transit rights in the event of a war in such a manner to suggest that they wanted the talks to fail, suggesting that the Soviet hard line against Germany was just posturing. The Romanians and even more so the Poles expressed a great deal of fear that if the Red Army were allowed transit rights to enter their countries on the way to fight Germany that they would fail to leave once the war was over; the Narkomindel failed to provide convincing reassurances on that point.

League of Nations

When the Council of the League of Nations met in London, the only delegate in favour of sanctions against Germany was Maxim Litvinov, the representative of the Soviet Union. Though Germany was no longer a member of the League, Ribbentrop was allowed to give a speech before the League Assembly on 19 March where he tried to justify Germany's actions as something imposed on the Reich by the Franco-Soviet pact, and warned that there would be serious economic consequences for those states who voted to impose sanctions on Germany. By 1936, a number of Eastern European, Scandinavian  and Latin American countries whose economies were hard-pressed by the Great Depression had become very dependent upon trade with Germany to keep their economies afloat, which meant for economic reasons alone none of those states wished to offend Germany. President Federico Páez of Ecuador gave a speech in which he declared the idea of sanctions against the Reich to be "nonsensical". At the time, the British Foreign Office estimated that Britain, France, Romania, Belgium, Czechoslovakia and the Soviet Union were the only nations in the entire world willing to impose sanctions on Germany. The Swedish, Danish, Norwegian, Polish, Dutch, Greek, Swiss, Turkish, Chilean, Estonian, Portuguese, Spanish, and Finnish ambassadors to the League all let it be known that they regarded sanctions on Germany as "economic suicide" for their countries. Mussolini, who was still angry with the League sanctions applied against Italy, made a speech in which he made it clear that he definitely would not be joining any sanctions against Germany for remilitarizing the Rhineland. In the fall of 1935, Britain had been able to have the League impose limited sanctions on Italy, but by the later winter of 1936, the idea of imposing sweeping sanctions on Germany—whose economy was four times the size of Italy's, making Germany an "economic octopus" whose tentacles were everywhere around the world—was unthinkable for rest of the world. Moreover, for the sanctions to work, the United States had to join in. In 1935, the American government had declared that as the U.S. was not a League member, it would not abide by the League sanctions on Italy, which was hardly a hopeful precedent for the idea that U.S. would join in with imposing sanctions on Germany. Argentina declared that it would vote for sanctions against Germany only if the United States promised to join in. The Council declared, though not unanimously, that the remilitarization constituted a breach of the Treaties of Versailles and Locarno. Hitler was invited to plan a new scheme for European security, and he responded by claiming he had "no territorial claims in Europe" and wanted a 25-year pact of non-aggression with Britain and France. However, when the British Government inquired further into this proposed pact, they did not receive a reply.

Aftermath
The remilitarization changed the balance of power decisively toward Germany. France's credibility in standing against German expansion or aggression was left in doubt. France's military strategy was entirely defensive and lacked the slightest intention of invading Germany but planned to defend the Maginot Line. France's failure to send even a single unit into the Rhineland showed that strategy to the rest of Europe.

Potential allies in Eastern Europe could no longer trust an alliance with France, which could not be trusted to deter Germany through the threat of an invasion, and without such a deterrence, allies would be militarily helpless.

Belgium dropped its defensive alliance with France and returned to its reliance on neutrality during a war. France's neglect to expand the Maginot Line to cover the Belgian border allowed Germany to invade precisely there in 1940.

Mussolini had pushed back against German expansion, but since he now realised co-operation with France to be unpromising, he began to swing toward Germany. All of France's allies were disappointed, and even Pope Pius XI told the French ambassador, "Had you ordered the immediate advance of 200,000 men into the zone the Germans had occupied, you would have done everyone a very great favor".

With the Rhineland remilitarized, Germany started the construction of the Siegfried Line, which meant that if Germany attacked any of the states in the cordon sanitaire, the ability of France to threaten an invasion was now limited. Such was the impact of the remilitarization on the balance of power that Czechoslovak President Edvard Beneš even seriously considered renouncing the alliance with France and to seek a rapprochement with Germany. He abandoned that idea only after it had become clear that the price of a rapprochement would be the effective loss of Czechoslovak independence.

Likewise, King Carol II of Romania concluded that Romania might have to abandon its alliance with France and to accept that his country to move from the French to the  German sphere of influence.

When William Christian Bullitt, Jr., newly appointed as American ambassador to France, visited Germany in May 1936 and met with Baron von Neurath there. On 18 May 1936, Bullitt reported to President Franklin Roosevelt: "Von Neurath said that it was the policy of the German government to do nothing active in foreign affairs until 'the Rhineland had been digested'. He explained that he meant that until the German fortifications had been constructed on the French and Belgian borders, the German government would do everything possible to prevent rather than encourage an outbreak by Nazis in Austria and would pursue a quiet line with regard to Czechoslovakia. 'As soon as our fortifications are constructed and the countries of Central Europe realize that France cannot enter German territory at will, all those countries will begin to feel very differently about their foreign policies and a new constellation will develop', he said". 

From 15 to 20 June 1936, the chiefs of staff of the Little Entente of Czechoslovakia, Romania and Yugoslavia met to discuss the changed international situation. They decided to maintain their present plans for a war with Hungary but concluded that with the Rhineland now remilitarized, there was little hope of effective French action in the event of a war against Germany. The meeting ended with the conclusion that there now were only two great powers in Eastern Europe (Germany and the Soviet Union), and the best that could be hoped for was to avoid another war, which would almost certainly mean the loss of their small nations' independence, regardless of the winner.

Weinberg wrote that attitude of the entire German elite and much of the German people was that any new war would only benefit Germany and that ending the Rhineland's demilitarized status could be only a good thing by opening the door to starting a new war. He considered the attitude was extremely short-sighted, self-destructive and stupid, even from a narrowly-German viewpoint. Weinberg noted that Germany had lost its independence in 1945 and far more territory under the Oder-Neisse Line, which was imposed that year, than it ever had under Versailles. Together with its millions killed and the destruction of its cities, he believed that from the German viewpoint, the best thing to do would have been accepting Versailles, rather than starting a new war, which ended with Germany being totally crushed, partitioned and occupied.

Notes

References and further reading

Correlli Barnett. The Collapse of British Power, London: Pan, 2002.
 Brian Bond. "The Continental Commitment In British Strategy in the 1930s" pp. 197–208 from The Fascist Challenge and the Policy of Appeasement edited by Wolfgang Mommsen and Lothar Kettenacker, London: George Allen & Unwin, 1983, .
Alan Bullock. Hitler: A Study in Tyranny, London: Odhams, 1962.
 Jean-Baptiste Duroselle. France and the Nazi Threat: The Collapse of French Diplomacy 1932–1939, New York: Enigma Books, 2004, .
 Emmerson, J.T. The Rhineland Crisis 7 March 1936 A Study in Multilateral Diplomacy, Ames: Iowa State University Press, 1977.
 Richard J. Evans. The Third Reich in Power, 1933 – 1939: How the Nazis Won Over the Hearts and Minds of a Nation (Penguin Books, 2012). 
 Martin Gilbert. Churchill: A Life, London: Pimlico, 2000.
 Gilbert, Martin and Richard Gott. The Appeasers, London: Phoenix Press, 2000.
 Hederson, S. N. "Hitler and the Rhineland, 1936." History Today 42.10 (1992): 15-21.
 John Heinemann. Hitler's First Foreign Minister: Konstantin Freiherr von Neurath, Diplomat and Statesman, Berkeley : University of California Press, 1979 .
 Hochman, Jiri. The Soviet Union and the Failure of Collective Security 1934–1938. (1984)
 Hyde, Charles Cheney. 'Belgium and Neutrality', The American Journal of International Law, Vol. 31, No. 1. (January 1937), pp. 81–5.
Kershaw, Ian. Hitler Hubris, New York: Norton, 1998. .
 Kershaw, Ian. The Nazi Dictatorship: Problems and Perspectives of Interpretation, London: Arnold, 2000.
 Medlicott, W.N.  Britain and Germany: The Search For Agreement 1930–1937, London: Athlone Press, 1969.
 Nicolson, Harold. The Harold Nicolson Diaries: 1919–1964, London: Weidenfeld & Nicolson, 2004.
 Offner, Arnold. "The United States and National Socialist Germany" pages 413–427 from The Fascist Challenge and the Policy of Appeasement edited by Wolfgang Mommsen and Lothar Kettenacker, George Allen & Unwin: London, United Kingdom, 1983.
 Parker, R.A.C. "The First Capitulation: France and the Rhineland Crisis of 1936" pages 355–373 from World Politics, Volume 8, Issue # 3, April 1956.
 Parker, R.A.C. "Alternatives to Appeasement" pp. 206–21 from The Origins of The Second World War edited by Patrick Finney Edward Arnold: London, United Kingdom, 1997.
 Ripsman, Norrin M., and Jack S. Levy. "The preventive war that never happened: Britain, France, and the rise of Germany in the 1930s." Security Studies 16.1 (2007): 32-67 online
 Roi, Michael Lawrence. Alternative to Appeasement: Sir Robert Vansittart and Alliance Diplomacy, 1934–1937, Westport: Greenwood, 1997.
 Schuker, Stephen. "France and the Remilitarization of the Rhineland, 1936" pp. 206–21 from The Origins of the Second World War edited by Patrick Finney, London: Arnold Press, London, 1997. .
 Schuker, Stephen.  "The End of Versailles" pages 38–56 from The Origins of the Second World War Reconsidered: A.J.P. Taylor And The Historians edited by Gordon Martel, London: Routledge: 1999.
 Shirer, William. The Rise and Fall of the Third Reich, New York: Viking.
 Shore, Zach.  "Hitler, Intelligence and the Decision to Remilitarize the Rhine" pages 5–18 from Journal of Contemporary History, Volume 34, Issue #1, January 1999.
Smith, Denis Mack. "Appeasement as a Factor in Mussolini's Foreign Policy" from The Fascist Challenge and the Policy of Appeasement edited by Wolfgang Mommsen and Lothar Kettenacker, London: George Allen & Unwin, 1983.
A. J. P. Taylor. The Origins of the Second World War, London: Penguin, 1976.
 Toynbee, Arnold J. Survey Of  Inteenational Affairs: 1935  Volume I (1937) pp 352–69 online
 Watt, D.C. "The Reoccupation of the Rhineland" History Today (April 1956) 6#4 pp 244–251
Gerhard Weinberg. The Foreign Policy of Hitler's Germany Diplomatic Revolution in Europe 1933–36, Chicago: University of Chicago Press, 1970.
Weinberg, Gerhard. Hitler's Foreign Policy 1933–1939: The Road to World War II, New York, Enigma Books, 2013.
Robert J. Young. In Command of France; French Foreign Policy and Military Planning, 1933–1940,  Cambridge: Harvard University Press, 1978, .
Young, Robert. France and the Origins of the Second World War'', New York: St. Martin's Press, 1996, .

External links
 Map of Europe showing political situation during Hitler's remilitarization of the Rhineland at omniatlas.com

1936 in Germany
20th century in North Rhine-Westphalia
20th century in Rhineland-Palatinate
Conflicts in 1936
History of the Rhineland
March 1936 events
Military of Nazi Germany
Rhine Province
France–Germany relations
War scare